The Fier Power Station was Albania's largest thermal power plant having 6 identical groups of 31 MW each thus totalling a capacity of 186 MW.

The plant was decommissioned in 2007.

References

2007 disestablishments in Albania
Buildings and structures in Fier
Coal-fired power stations in Albania